Martin Kamburov (born 13 October 1980) is a former Bulgarian professional footballer who played as a striker. He is the top scorer in Bulgarian First League history with 256 goals.

Kamburov spent the majority of his career with Lokomotiv Plovdiv. He is Lokomotiv's all-time 2nd highest goalscorer in the Bulgarian League, scoring 145 goals in his five periods with the club. He also played for Botev Plovdiv, Svilengrad, Spartak Pleven, Lokomotiv Sofia, CSKA Sofia, Al-Ahli Dubai, Greek side Asteras Tripolis, Chinese Dalian Shide, Beroe Stara Zagora and CSKA 1948.

Career

Early career
Born in Svilengrad, Kamburov began his career with Botev Plovdiv. He made his first-team debut during 1998–99 season, scoring his first goal in a 3–1 away loss against Neftochimic Burgas on 6 March 1999. Then he switched to local rivals Lokomotiv Plovdiv, with whom he won the top Bulgarian league, A PFG, in 2004, and the bronze medals in 2005. Kamburov was also the league top scorer in these two seasons with 26 and 27 goals respectively.

Al-Ahli
In December 2005, Kamburov was transferred to the UAE in Al-Ahli (Dubai) side for €2 million and signed a five-year contract. He was capped 33 times and scored 16 goals. In 2007, he returned to his former club – Lokomotiv Plovdiv.

Lokomotiv Sofia
Lokomotiv Sofia signed Martin Kamburov on 9 January 2009 to a three-year deal. He was given the number 19 shirt. Kamburov had an excellent start to the season, netting 10 goals in just 6 games, including a spectacular hat-trick in Loko Sofia's away game against Levski Sofia on 11 April 2009 to help the team from the Nadezhda district secure a historic 3:0 win. Kamburov became the top scorer in the 2008/2009 season in the Bulgarian A Professional Football Group, managing 17 goals in total, a remarkable achievement given that he only played in half of the season's games.
In the winter of 2009, Kamburov won the best forward of A PFG award once again. At around the same time, he was again called up for the Bulgarian national football team, with his selection greeted with enthusiasm by most Bulgarian fans.

Kamburov ended the 2009/2010 season with 29 matches and 16 goals.

Dalian Shide
Kamburov was transferred to Dalian Shide in July 2010. He made his debut for Dalian on 28 July and scored his first CSL goal on 1 August.

CSKA Sofia
On 18 December 2012 Kamburov signed a one-and-a-half-year deal with CSKA Sofia. His official debut came in the 0:2 home loss against Litex Lovech on 2 March 2013 and he scored his first goal on 31 March 2013 in the 3:0 home win over Minyor Pernik. Kamburov made his first appearance in The Eternal Derby on 27 April 2013, coming on as a second-half substitute in a match that was lost 1:2 by his team.

Lokomotiv Plovdiv
In the summer of 2013, Kamburov rejoined Lokomotiv Plovdiv. He became the league's top scorer in the 2013–14 season for fourth time in his career with 20 goals in 35 matches.

CSKA Sofia
On 5 June 2014, Kamburov returned to CSKA Sofia, signing a contract for a period of one year. Kamburov's second stint with the "armymen" turned out to be even shorter than the first, as he made just two official appearances for the team - in the matches with Moldovan team Zimbru Chisinau in the UEFA Europa League, before leaving the club in late July 2014, in part due to his belief that he may not be able to get sufficient playing time for them.

Lokomotiv Plovdiv
Kamburov then rejoined Lokomotiv Plovdiv and scored a goal in his first game of the 2014–15 season - a 2–1 away win over Haskovo on 2 August.
On 3 August 2017, Kamburov's contract was terminated by mutual agreement.

Beroe
On 8 August 2017, Kamburov signed with Beroe Stara Zagora. Following the departure of Martin Raynov in February 2019, Kamburov was made captain of Beroe. On 5 March 2019, he signed a one-year contract extension, keeping him at Beroe until 2020.

CSKA 1948
In June 2020, while still part of the Beroe team with which he completed the season, Kamburov signed a deal with CSKA 1948.

Beroe
On 13 September 2021, Kamburov scored the only goal in Beroe's 1:0 win over Tsarsko Selo, which was the 254th occasion of him finding the net in the Bulgarian top division. He thus surpassed Petar Zhekov's record of 253 goals.

International career
Kamburov earned his first cap for Bulgaria on 18 November 2003, replacing goalscorer Vladimir Manchev in the 1:0 away win over South Korea in a friendly match.

Statistics

Honours

Club 
Lokomotiv Plovdiv
 A Group (1): 2003–04
 Bulgarian Supercup (1): 2004

Al-Ahli Dubai
 UAE Pro League (1): 2005–06

Individual 
 A Group top scorer (6): 2003–04 (25 goals), 2004–05 (27 goals), 2008–09 (17 goals), 2013–14 (20 goals), 2015–16 (18 goals), 2019–20 (18 goals)
 Best forward in the A Group (5): 2009, 2013, 2014, 2020, 2021 
2nd place in the Bulgarian Footballer of the Year ranking - 2017, 2021

References

External links

1980 births
Living people
Bulgarian footballers
Bulgaria international footballers
Botev Plovdiv players
PFC Lokomotiv Plovdiv players
PFC Spartak Pleven players
Al Ahli Club (Dubai) players
Asteras Tripolis F.C. players
FC Lokomotiv 1929 Sofia players
Dalian Shide F.C. players
PFC CSKA Sofia players
PFC Beroe Stara Zagora players
FC CSKA 1948 Sofia players
First Professional Football League (Bulgaria) players
UAE Pro League players
Super League Greece players
Chinese Super League players
Bulgarian expatriate footballers
Bulgarian expatriate sportspeople in the United Arab Emirates
Bulgarian expatriate sportspeople in Greece
Bulgarian expatriate sportspeople in China
Expatriate footballers in the United Arab Emirates
Expatriate footballers in Greece
Expatriate footballers in China
People from Svilengrad
Association football forwards
Sportspeople from Haskovo Province